Alaa' Hassan Matalqa is a Jordanian footballer who plays as a left back for Al-Hussein.

International career
Matalqa's last match with the Jordan national team was against Azerbaijan in an international friendly in Amman on 5 February 2010, which resulted in a 2-0 victory for Azerbaijan.

Honors and Participation in International Tournaments

In AFC Asian Cups 
2004 Asian Cup

In WAFF Championships 
2004 WAFF Championship
2007 WAFF Championship
2008 WAFF Championship

International goals

References
Confirmed: Al-Naber Signs Up for Al-Faisaly (Amman) and Matalqa for Shabab Al-Ordon

External links 

  

1982 births
Living people
Jordanian footballers
Jordan international footballers
Association football defenders
Sportspeople from Amman